Zwiefelhofer is a surname. Notable people with the surname include:

  (1932–2008), German priest and theologian
 Thomas Zwiefelhofer (born 1969), Liechtenstein politician
 Vlastimil Zwiefelhofer (born 1952), Czech long-distance runner